Kaimbulawa is an Austronesian language of Siompu Island southwest of Buton Island, which is off the southeast coast of Sulawesi in Indonesia. It belongs to the Muna–Buton branch of the Celebic subgroup.

References

Muna–Buton languages
Languages of Sulawesi